Peter O'Brien may refer to:

Sportsmen
Peter O'Brien (outfielder) (born 1990), MLB outfielder, 2015–present
Pete O'Brien (1900s second baseman) (1877–1917), MLB second baseman, 1901–1907
Pete O'Brien (1890s second baseman) (1867–1937), MLB second baseman, 1887–1890
Pete O'Brien (first baseman) (born 1958), MLB first baseman, 1982–1993
Peter O'Brien (Gaelic footballer), Gaelic football goalkeeper
Peter O'Brien (rugby league) (1928–2016), Australian rugby league footballer
Peter O'Brien (hurler) (born 1987), Irish hurler

Others
Peter O'Brien, 1st Baron O'Brien (1842–1914), known as Sir Peter O'Brien, Bt, Irish lawyer and judge
Peter O'Brien (actor) (born 1960), Australian actor
Peter O'Brien (theologian) (born 1935), Australian New Testament scholar
Peter O'Brien (Medal of Honor) (1842–1898), American Civil War soldier and Medal of Honor recipient

See also
Peter O'Brian (disambiguation)